Tamires Cássia Dias de Britto (born 10 October 1987), commonly known as Tamires, is a Brazilian professional footballer who plays as a left-back for Corinthians and the Brazil national team. She participated at the 2015 and 2019 editions of the FIFA Women's World Cup, as well as at the 2016 Olympic Games.

Club career
In 2008, Tamires made 10 appearances in the American W-League for Charlotte Lady Eagles, where she was nicknamed "Tam-tam". She joined Centro Olímpico in 2013, after playing for other Brazilian teams including Santos. In summer 2015 she agreed a move to Danish Elitedivisionen club Fortuna Hjørring.

In June 2019, she agreed a one-year contract with Corinthians, who gave her the number 37 shirt.

International career

Tamires played for the São Paulo select team, which represented Brazil at the 2006 Peace Queen Cup. She made her senior debut in September 2013, against New Zealand at the 2013 Valais Women's Cup. In Brazil's next match, she scored her first national team goal in a 4–0 win over Mexico.

At the 2014 Copa América Femenina, Tamires scored the fifth goal in Brazil's 6–0 rout of Argentina. In February 2015, she was included in an 18-month residency programme intended to prepare the national team for the 2015 FIFA Women's World Cup in Canada and the 2016 Rio Olympics. At the 2015 FIFA Women's World Cup, Brazil lost 1–0 in the second round to Australia. Tamires remained in Canada as part of the victorious Brazilian selection at the 2015 Pan American Games in Toronto.

In July 2015, Tamires was the victim of a robbery while leaving her mother's house in Santo André, and her Pan American Games gold medal was stolen. The Brazilian Football Confederation (CBF) presented her with a replica.

Tamires was named to the Brazil squad for the 2016 Summer Olympics, her first Olympic Games. She remained the national team's first-choice left-back at the 2019 FIFA Women's World Cup in France. She earned her 100th cap on 12 December 2019 against Mexico.

International goals

Personal life
Tamires has one son Bernardo together with César Britto

Honors

Club
Fortuna Hjørring
Elitedivisionen: 2015-16, 2017-18
Danish Women's Cup: 2015–16, 2018–19

Corinthians
Copa Libertadores: 2019, 2021
Campeonato Brasileiro: 2020, 2021
Campeonato Paulista: 2019, 2020, 2021

International
Copa América Femenina: 2014, 2018,2022

Individual
 IFFHS CONMEBOL Woman Team of the Decade 2011–2020

References

External links

Tamires Cássia Dias Gomes – FIFA World Cup profile

1987 births
Living people
Brazilian women's footballers
Brazil women's international footballers
2015 FIFA Women's World Cup players
Footballers at the 2016 Summer Olympics
Women's association football defenders
Associação Desportiva Centro Olímpico players
Santos FC (women) players
Sport Club Corinthians Paulista (women) players
USL W-League (1995–2015) players
Brazilian expatriate women's footballers
Brazilian expatriate sportspeople in Denmark
Expatriate women's soccer players in the United States
Brazilian expatriate sportspeople in the United States
Fortuna Hjørring players
Expatriate women's footballers in Denmark
Associação Ferroviária de Esportes (women) players
Olympic footballers of Brazil
2019 FIFA Women's World Cup players
FIFA Century Club
Pan American Games medalists in football
Pan American Games gold medalists for Brazil
Footballers at the 2015 Pan American Games
Medalists at the 2015 Pan American Games
Footballers at the 2020 Summer Olympics
Sportspeople from Minas Gerais
Charlotte Lady Eagles players